Since the 2023–24 AFC Champions League and the 2023–24 AFC Cup adopted transitional calendar with the switch from Spring-to-Autumn to an Autumn-to-Spring schedule, the All India Football Federation decided that its continental slots are determined by extra playoffs.

Qualification for AFC Champions League group stage entrant

Qualification for AFC Cup group stage entrant

Qualification for AFC Cup qualifying play-off participant

Notes

References

 
Football
Football
Football
India
India
India
Seasons in Indian football